A.D.A.M. The Inside Story is a 1995 scientific educational interactive CD-ROM. It was one in a series of titles made in collaboration between Columbia/HCA Healthcare Corporation and A.D.A.M. Software, alongside titles such as A.D.A.M. Life's Greatest Mysteries and A.D.A.M. Nine Month Miracle.

Format and interface
Information is organized in the style of a chapter book, with different sections providing information and digital illustrations pertaining to each of various organ systems within the human body. There is an option to block access to the section on the reproductive system and cover the intimate parts of the digital models of Adam and Eve with fig leaves.

Reception
SuperKids called it an "excellent" piece of human body software. The game won a Codie Consumer Software Award for Best Home Learning Program.

References

1995 video games
Children's educational video games
Classic Mac OS games
Science educational video games
Video games developed in the United States
Windows games